Par River is a river in Gujarat in western India with its source near wadpada village in Nashik Maharashtra. Its drainage basin has a maximum length of 51 km. It flows from Valsad district and into the Arabian Sea. There is a small town Killa Pardi, which it passes near. The British constructed a bridge on this river while they ruled India. Atul Industries was established on the Parnera hills side of the river.

References 

Rivers of Gujarat
Rivers of India